Michael Allan Domb (born 1955) is an American real estate developer and Democratic politician, currently serving as an at-large member of the Philadelphia City Council. Born and raised in northern New Jersey, he moved to Philadelphia after graduating from college. After a successful career in Philadelphia real estate, he entered politics for the first time in 2015, being elected to the Philadelphia City Council. On November 15, he announced his candidacy for the 2023 Philadelphia Mayoral Election.

Early life and education
Domb was born in 1955 in Jersey City, New Jersey, the second son of Edward Domb and Betty Schlesinger Domb. Domb's father and grandfather worked in the embroidery business. The family relocated to nearby Fort Lee, New Jersey, soon after Domb's birth. Domb and his older brother, Peter, embarked on a series of odd jobs from a young age, shining shoes, shoveling snow, and mowing lawns. He graduated from Fort Lee High School in 1973 and started college at American University in Washington, D.C. Domb took evening classes there and worked full-time selling security systems for Phelps Time Lock Service in Hyattsville, Maryland. He graduated in 1977 with a marketing degree and continued to work for Phelps, being transferred to Philadelphia to manage the company's office in that city.

Business career
To earn extra money while managing the Phelps office, Domb earned a real estate license at Temple University. As the real estate business became more profitable, he quit the security business job and sold real estate full time, opening his own office in 1983. Domb specialized in real estate near Philadelphia's Rittenhouse Square and soon became well known among property buyers and sellers in that neighborhood. He was elected president of the Greater Philadelphia Association of Realtors (GPAR) in 1990, the youngest president that organization had ever elected. After success in real estate sales, Domb expanded into real estate development in 1999, and worked with restaurateur Stephen Starr to develop restaurants in Philadelphia.

Domb was again elected president of the GPAR in 2013, by which time he had acquired the nickname "Philly Condo King." In his second term as GPAR president, he worked with Mayor Michael Nutter and the city government on ideas to collect delinquent property taxes and attract new residents to the city. He also worked with City Council President Darrell L. Clarke to determine the market value and ultimate disposition of some of the city's inactive school buildings. Even after entering politics, Domb remained active in the real estate business, purchasing a 19-story office building in April 2016.

Political career

Nutter was term-limited, so the office of mayor would be open in the 2015 election. Domb, a registered independent, was said to be "testing the waters" as a possibly independent or Republican candidate for mayor. Instead, in May of that year, Domb announced he would run as a Democrat for one of the city's seven at-large council seats. Pledging some of his vast personal wealth to the cause, Domb described his goals in office: "We will talk about collecting taxes from out-of-state landlords and using that money to fund our schools. New job training programs. And partnering with our universities to mentor our children."

In the primary election that month, Domb placed third, winning one of the five Democratic nominations. In the general election in the majority-Democratic city, Domb again placed third, earning a seat on the council. In office, Domb continued to search for solution to the city's large number of tax-delinquent properties.

Domb resigned from City Council on August 15, 2022, as prelude to an expected run for mayor in 2023. On November 15, 2022, he declared his candidacy for the Mayoral race.

See also
List of members of Philadelphia City Council since 1952

References

Sources

1955 births
Living people
People from Fort Lee, New Jersey
Businesspeople from Jersey City, New Jersey
American University alumni
American real estate businesspeople
Temple University alumni
Businesspeople from Pennsylvania
Pennsylvania Democrats
Philadelphia City Council members
Politicians from Jersey City, New Jersey
Fort Lee High School alumni